Cephaloplatus elegans is a species of shield bugs in the tribe Carpocorini. It is found in the Northern Territory, Australia.

References

External links 

 Cephaloplatus elegans at Atlas of Living Australia

Pentatomidae
Insects described in 1992
Insects of Australia
Fauna of the Northern Territory